Povl is a Danish masculine given name. It is the Danish cognate of the name Paul. The name may refer to:

People
Povl Ahm (1926–2005), Danish engineer
Povl Bang-Jensen (1909– 1959), Danish diplomat
Povl Baumann (1878–1963), Danish architect
Povl Erik Carstensen (born 1960), Danish comedian and actor
Povl Christensen (1909–1977), Danish artist
Povl Ole Fanger (1934–2006), Danish engineer 
Povl Gerlow (1881–1959), Danish sports shooter
Povl Hamburger (1901–1972), Danish organist and composer
Povl Kjøller (1937–1999), Danish musician
Povl Mark (1889–1957), Danish gymnast
Povl Riis (born 1925), Danish physician
Povl Riis-Knudsen (born 1950), Danish neo-Nazi 
Povl Søndergaard (1905–1986), Danish sculptor
Povl Stegmann (1888–1944), Danish architect 
Povl Winning Toussieng (1892–1967), Danish doctor
Povl Wøldike (1899–1975), Danish actor

See also
Poul
Paul (name)

Danish masculine given names